Simona Renciu (born 21 December 1967) is a retired Romanian artistic gymnast. In 1983 she won the silver world medal with the team at the 1983 World Championships. After retirement she emigrated to Luxemburg, where she is working as a judge for the Luxemburg Gymnastics Federation and as a gymnastics coach at the Le Réveil Bettenbourg Club.

References

1967 births
Living people
Romanian female artistic gymnasts
Medalists at the World Artistic Gymnastics Championships